Parvathipuram Manyam district is a district in the Indian state of Andhra Pradesh. With Parvathipuram as its administrative headquarters, it became functional from 4th April 2022. The district was formed from Parvathipuram revenue division from Vizianagaram district and part of Palakonda revenue division of Srikakulam district.The district was once the part of ancient Kalinga. The Famous Kamalingeswara Swamy temple was built in the regin of King Rajaraja Deva of Eastern Ganga Dynasty of Odisha in 11th century CE.

Geography
This district  is located between Northern latitude of 18.8 , Eastern longitude of 83.4.This district is bounded by North of Koraput district of Odisha state And surrounded by South of Vizianagaram district, Srikakulam district and west of Alluri Sitharama Raju district and east of Rayagada district of Odisha state .

Administrative divisions 
The district has two revenue divisions, namely Palakonda and Parvathipuram, each headed by a sub collector. These revenue divisions are divided into 15 mandals.

Mandals 

There are 7 mandals in Palakonda division and 8 in Parvathipuram division. The 15 mandals under their revenue divisions are listed below:

Cities and towns

Politics 

There are one parliamentary and 4 assembly constituencies in Parvathipuram Manyam district. The parliamentary constituencies are 
The assembly constituencies are

Demographics 

At the time of the 2011 census the district had a population of 9,25,340, of which 124,104 (13.41%) live in urban areas. Parvathipuram Manyam district has a sex ratio of 1035 females per 1000 males and a literacy rate of 50.9%. Scheduled Castes and Scheduled Tribes make up 1,10,169 (11.91%) and 2,60,419 (28.14%) of the population respectively.

At the time of the 2011 census, 89.00% of the population spoke Telugu, 5.86% Sora and 2.15% Kuvi as their first language.

References 

Districts of Andhra Pradesh
Parvathipuram Manyam district
2022 establishments in Andhra Pradesh